Vigna vexillata var. angustifolia, known as the wild cow pea is a small climbing plant. A variety of the widespread tropical plant Vigna vexillata, found in Australia.

References

Fabales of Australia
vexillata var. angustifolia
Flora of New South Wales
Flora of Queensland
Flora of the Northern Territory